The 2020 Tahiti Championship D2 is the second-level Tahitian rugby union club competition, behind the Tahiti Championship, for the 2020 season. It runs alongside the 2020 Tahiti Championship competition; both competitions are operated by the Fédération Polynésienne de Rugby (FPR).

Playing was suspended after the 2nd Matchday due to the COVID-19 pandemic in Tahiti. The season was officially suspended on 9 August

Teams

Number of teams by regions
All but one team this season are from Paea, a suburb of the Papeete Urban Area.

Table

There's no third division so teams face no relegation.

References

Rugby union competitions
Tahiti
Rugby union in Tahiti
Tahiti